Philip David Morehead (born 1942) is an American pianist, conductor and vocal coach now retired as head of music staff of the Lyric Opera of Chicago, and the Patrick G. and Shirley W. Ryan Opera Center (formerly the Lyric Opera Center for American Artists). His previous positions at the Lyric Opera of Chicago have included Music Administrator and Chorus Master.

Biography
He was born in New York City in 1942, the son of writer Albert Hodges Morehead, and learned to play the piano at age four. He attended Trinity School in New York City, The Baylor School in Chattanooga, Tennessee, Swarthmore College where he majored in French, Harvard University where he majored in musicology and received an M.A., and the New England Conservatory of Music where he majored in piano performance and received an M.M. He then studied for two years in Paris and in Fontainebleau with Nadia Boulanger. He later married Patricia Noonan of Winnipeg, Manitoba.

Prior to 1978, Morehead lived in Boston, Massachusetts, where he was the musical director of the New England Chamber Opera Group, where he conducted the American premieres of Busoni's Arlecchino and Handel's Imeneo, the world premiere of Paul Earls' The Death of King Phillip, in addition to other works including Stravinsky's Mavra and Menotti's The Medium. He was also the musical director of the Newton Chamber Orchestra and the Brookline Symphony Orchestra. He was the assistant conductor of the Tanglewood Festival Chorus, the rehearsal pianist for the Boston Symphony Orchestra, and for seven years he was a member of the faculty of the Berkshire Music Center at Tanglewood. He has performed as a pianist and harpsichordist, and played continuo with the Boston Symphony under Seiji Ozawa, and Leonard Bernstein.

Before he joined the Lyric Opera of Chicago in 1981, he was coordinator of the Orchestral Training Program at the Royal Conservatory of Music in Toronto. His previous positions in Canada included the conductorship of the Bach-Elgar Choir in Hamilton, Ontario. From 1984 to 1985 he conducted for the Canadian Contemporary Music Workshop concerts including the Canadian premiere of Bernd Alois Zimmermann's Concerto for Oboe. From 1981 to 1985 he worked with Tulsa Opera in Tulsa, Oklahoma. In Spring of 1983 he conducted student performances of Puccini's Madame Butterfly, and in 1984 he conducted the Spring production of Gilbert & Sullivan's Pirates of Penzance.

Morehead was the cover conductor for the Lyric Opera of Chicago for Die Meistersinger, Jenůfa, Der fliegende Holländer, Sweeney Todd, Billy Budd and others. He conducted performances of Un ballo in maschera, The Mikado and Die Fledermaus and the premiere production of Anthony Davis's Amistad  and student performances of La traviata, The Cunning Little Vixen, and Carmen. He also conducted performances of Rossini's Cinderella for the Ryan Opera Center. He twice conducted the Center's Rising Stars concerts and the special presentation of The Magic Victrola.

Morehead is also a free-lance pianist, harpsichordist, and conductor. His conducting includes performances of Boulez' Improvisations sur Malarmé for the Contemporary Chamber Players at the University of Chicago and Gounod's Faust at Illinois State University. He was a founding member of CUBE (1987-2013), the Chicago-based chamber ensemble specializing in the performance of new music. With the CUBE ensemble he performed as pianist in a wide variety of repertoire and conducted the ensemble in world premieres of William Ferris An Eden Garden, Sebastian Huydt's Three Serious Songs, and Russ Grazier's Leaving, Arriving, among other works. Morehead was also on the board of directors of the Conductors Guild and was a member of the Artistic and Awards Committee of the Solti Foundation U.S.

Morehead retired from Lyric Opera of Chicago in 2015 and currently resides in Dwight, Ontario, Canada. He is a member of the Muskoka Big Band in Huntsville, Ontario and is Music Director of the Highlands Opera Studio in Haliburton, Ontario, where he has conducted performances of Gounod Faust, Mozart Così fan tutte, Puccini La Boheme and Strauss Ariadne auf Naxos. He is married to Patricia Morehead, PhD. (oboist and composer) and has three adult children (James, Keren and Ian).

Editor
New American Roget's College Thesaurus, 
New American Crossword Puzzle Dictionary, 
The New American Webster's Handy College Dictionary 
Hoyle's Rules of Games,

Author
Dictionary of Music, The New American, 
The Bloomsbury Dictionary of Music, 
The Penguin Roget's College Thesaurus in Dictionary Form,

References

External links
  (Philip Morehead, professional)
  (Phil & Pat Morehead, personal)
Philip David Morehead at Center Stage
Philip David Morehead at Baylor School
 
Note: some may be works by his father Albert Morehead or parents Albert and Loy Morehead. The son may have updated their reference books. 

1942 births
American classical pianists
American harpsichordists
American choral conductors
American conductors (music)
Living people
Musicians from New York City
Swarthmore College alumni
Harvard University alumni
Academic staff of The Royal Conservatory of Music